Sabrina Debora Salerno (born 15 March 1968), known mononymously as Sabrina, is an Italian singer, songwriter, record producer, model, actress and television presenter.

During her career, she has sold over 20 million records worldwide and scored ten international hits, including three number ones. Internationally, she is best known for her 1987 single "Boys (Summertime Love)", which topped the charts in France and Switzerland, and peaked at No. 3 in the United Kingdom. The song was accompanied by a provocative music video, which established Sabrina's image as a sex symbol. Her other popular recordings include "All of Me (Boy Oh Boy)", "My Chico", "Like a Yo-Yo", "Gringo", "Siamo donne" and a cover version of "Call Me".

Early Life
Sabrina was brought up by her aunt in Genoa to begin with before moving to live with her grandparents in Sanremo. She went to live with her mother when she was 15. She sang in the choir at her local Catholic Church and at school formed a pop group with her friends.

Career

1980s
After winning a beauty contest in her native region, Liguria, Sabrina started modelling, and in 1984 she made her television debut on the Italian prime time show Premiatissima on Canale 5. In 1986, her debut single "Sexy Girl", sung in English, was released. Produced by Claudio Cecchetto, it became a Top 20 hit in her native Italy and was a modest international success. In late 1987, she released her first studio album, Sabrina, which was entirely sung in English. In addition to "Sexy Girl", the album included her international breakthrough hit "Boys (Summertime Love)" (Number 1 in both in France and Switzerland, and Top 5 in more than ten other countries;) and "Hot Girl", a Top 20 hit in some European countries. "Boys" gained popularity for its famous video, which included sexually suggestive scenes. The song has sold more than 1.5 million copies to date worldwide and remains Sabrina's trademark hit.

In 1988, Sabrina received the "Best European Singer" award during the Festivalbar event. She also enjoyed another European-wide summer hit with the single "All of Me (Boy Oh Boy)", produced by Stock Aitken Waterman. Matt Aitken praised Sabrina's performance in the studio, saying "as a singer she was pretty decent", but noted her modest clothing during the session "did not fulfil the promise that was expected."

Aitken expressed some disappointment over the song's chart performance relative to the huge success of "Boys", musing that "maybe the shock value was gone, or maybe they didn't shoot the right scene in the swimming pool for the video."

Later in that year, her second studio album, Super Sabrina, was released, and she maintained her image as a European sex symbol thanks to the raunchy videos that accompanied hits such as "My Chico" (her highest-charting single in Italy) and "Like a Yo-Yo", produced by Giorgio Moroder. The latter became the musical theme of Odiens, a very popular Italian prime time TV-show, in which Sabrina also appeared. Thanks to the success of her music and modelling, Sabrina performed in many European countries, among others at the Montreux Jazz Festival in 1988 and at the Olympic Stadium in Moscow, Russia, in 1989, where 50,000 people gathered over three days to see her perform. She even starred in a slightly risqué self-titled video game for home computers. In 1989, she starred in the Italian comedy film Fratelli d'Italia, directed by Neri Parenti, alongside such actors as Christian De Sica, Jerry Calà, and Massimo Boldi. She also released a new single, "Gringo", to moderate success and her first remix album called Super Remix.

1990s
In 1990, Sabrina was the hostess of the weekly prime time TV-show Ricomincio da 2 with Raffaella Carrà on Rai 2, and released a new single called "Yeah Yeah", which was only a modest hit. 1991 marked a turning point in Sabrina's career, when she recorded a duet with Italian singer Jo Squillo, "Siamo donne", her first release in Italian. They performed the song together at 1991's Sanremo Music Festival to much acclaim. Sabrina's third studio album, Over the Pop, was released the same year, and for the first time she was allowed to co-write and produce some of the songs. Sabrina's desire for independence and distancing from her glamour career led to a conflict with her management. As a result, the promotion of the album suffered and both the album and the follow-up single "Shadows of the Night" were commercial failures. A brand new single, "Cover Model", was released in France and Italy, but was unsuccessful in the charts and Sabrina parted ways with her label and management.

Sabrina released several non-album singles in 1994 and 1995, including the moderately successful "Angel Boy" and a new version of "Boys". In 1996, she established her own recording studio in Treviso with her then-husband Enrico Monti, and released her first Italian language album, Maschio dove sei which showcased her more mature pop rock sound. The album and its two singles, "Fatta e rifatta" and the title track, were surprisingly acclaimed by the critics, but were commercial failures due to a lack of promotion and distribution. The album would be re-released the following year as Numeri, featuring a new title song. Sabrina debuted as a theatrical actress in the comedy I cavalieri della Tavola Rotonda, playing the role of Morgan le Fay, and then hosted the game show Il mercante in fiera.

In 1998, Sabrina was cast in a comedy called Uomini sull'orlo di una crisi di nervi which was also very successful, and subsequently hosted the TV-show Cocco di mamma on Rai 1. In this show she would sing some Italian and international summer hits of the past, what led her to launching a comeback in music. In 1999, Sabrina released a new album, A Flower's Broken. Although the music video accompanying the song "I Love You" sparked some interest, both the album and the single were unsuccessful, largely due to the dissolution of her label RTI Music. Sabrina appeared on the British TV-show Eurotrash in which she performed "I Love You".

2000s
2001 saw Sabrina's comeback to theatre with the musical Emozioni, in which she starred alongside Vladimir Luxuria. The play received very good reviews from critics and toured Italy for almost three years. In 2002, Sabrina hosted another television show on Italia 1 called Matricole & Meteore, a ‘where are they now’ series in which she uncovered the current situations of former superstars, such as Shannen Doherty, Al Corley, Gary Coleman and Charlene Tilton. In 2005, she starred in the independent film Colori which premiered at Salerno's Independent Cinema Festival, where she won the Critics' Choice Award for "Best Actress". In November of that year, Sabrina performed at the nostalgia concert Diskoteka 80-kh in Russia. The following year, she premiered a new song called "I Feel Love (Good Sensation)" on her website.

In 2007, Sabrina toured France and published a cover version of the disco classic "Born to Be Alive" on her Myspace page. In 2008, she toured France again, with the nostalgia tour RFM Party 80, organized by the French radio network RFM. She also performed at another ‘80s revival concert in Poland, which was part of the Sopot Festival, together with Kim Wilde, Samantha Fox, Sandra, Thomas Anders (ex-Modern Talking), Limahl and Shakin' Stevens. In October 2008, Sabrina released a double album, called Erase/Rewind Official Remix, which included new versions of her old hits as well as several new tracks and cover versions.

2010s
In 2010, Sabrina and English singer Samantha Fox released a cover version of Blondie's hit "Call Me" as a duet. The single peaked at No. 4 on the Italian Dance Singles Sales Chart. During the summer of 2010 she hosted the prime time TV-show Mitici 80 on Italia 1. In 2012, Sabrina starred as herself in the French movie Stars 80, directed by Frédéric Forestier and produced by Thomas Langmann, and was on another RFM tour in France. In 2013, Sabrina featured on Neon Neon's song "Shopping (I Like To)", from the duo's second studio album Praxis Makes Perfect. During the same year, she continued touring in France with the RFM Party and started recording new material. During March and April 2014, Sabrina performed with and mentored a dance group called LECCEzione on Rai 1 prime time TV-show La Pista. In June, she released a Rick Nowels-produced single called "Colour Me", written and co-produced by Sabrina herself.

In 2015, she released a French cover of 1986 song "Ouragan" by Stephanie.

In 2018, she released a new single called "Voices".

Discography

 Sabrina (1987)
 Super Sabrina (1988)
 Over the Pop (1991)
 Maschio dove sei (1996)
 A Flower's Broken (1999)
 Erase/Rewind Official Remix (2008)

Filmography

Film

Television

References

External links

 
 
 
 

1968 births
Living people
20th-century Italian actresses
21st-century Italian actresses
Italian female models
Italian women singers
Italian film actresses
Italian musical theatre actresses
Italian pop singers
Italian record producers
Italian stage actresses
Italian television actresses
Italian Italo disco musicians
Musicians from Genoa
English-language singers from Italy
Italian women record producers
Glamour models
Mass media people from Genoa